Tomasz Bartnik (born 15 January 1990) is a Polish sport shooter.

He participated at the 2018 ISSF World Shooting Championships, winning a gold medal.

References

External links

Living people
1990 births
Polish male sport shooters
ISSF rifle shooters
Sportspeople from Warsaw
Universiade silver medalists for Poland
Universiade bronze medalists for Poland
Universiade medalists in shooting
European Games competitors for Poland
Shooters at the 2019 European Games
Medalists at the 2013 Summer Universiade
Shooters at the 2020 Summer Olympics
21st-century Polish people